Calliostoma benthicola is a species of medium-sized deepwater sea snail, a marine gastropod mollusc in the family Calliostomatidae, the calliostoma top snails.

Some authors place this taxon in the subgenus Calliostoma (Maurea).

Description
The height of the shell attains 26 mm.

Distribution
This marine species occurs off New Zealand.

References

External links

Further reading 
 Powell A. W. B., New Zealand Mollusca, William Collins Publishers Ltd, Auckland, New Zealand 1979 

benthicola
Gastropods of New Zealand
Gastropods described in 1950